This is an article about the electoral history of Henry McMaster.

Henry McMaster, a member of the Republican party, is the 117th Governor of South Carolina and assumed office January 24, 2017. He was elected the Attorney General of South Carolina, serving from 2003-2011, and Lieutenant Governor of South Carolina in 2014, serving from 2015-2017.  Upon the resignation of Nikki Haley, McMaster became governor. In 2018, he was elected to a full term and is seeking reelection in the 2022 election. Additionally, he unsuccessfully ran for the U.S. Senate in 1986, lieutenant governor in 1990, and governor in 2010.

References

McMaster, Henry